Obamus coronatus is a torus-shaped Ediacaran fossil from the Rawnsley Quartzite of South Australia named in honor of former American President Barack Obama by the lab of Mary L. Droser.

Morphology
The fossils show a multi-ridged body embedded in the biofilm of the original environment, with one end of the body tucked into or beneath the other end to form a ring, so that the living organism would have resembled a French cruller doughnut.

Etymology
The generic epithet honors President Obama, partly in reference to his love and patronage of the sciences, and allegedly because the fossil organisms resemble his ear.  The specific epithet, coronatus, meaning "equipped with a wreath" (or "crowned"), refers to the torus or ring-shape of the fossils.

See also
 List of things named after Barack Obama
 List of organisms named after famous people (born 1950–present)

References

Ediacaran life
Monotypic genera
Fossils of Australia
Fossil taxa described in 2020
Species named after Barack Obama